Discoidin, CUB and LCCL domain-containing protein 2 is a protein that in humans is encoded by the DCBLD2 gene.

Model organisms
Model organisms have been used in the study of DCBLD2 function. A conditional knockout mouse line called Dcbld2tm1a(KOMP)Wtsi was generated at the Wellcome Trust Sanger Institute. Male and female animals underwent a standardized phenotypic screen to determine the effects of deletion. Additional screens performed: - In-depth immunological phenotyping

References

Further reading